Southall DMU Depot was a traction maintenance depot located in Southall, London, England. The depot is situated on the Great Western Main Line and is near Southall station.

The depot code is SZ.

History 
Before its closure in 1975, Class 08 shunters and Class 117 DMUs could be seen at the depot.

Present 

After British Rail closed the depot, it wasn't used for another 18 years until the electrification programme for Heathrow Express was introduced, when it was used as a base. The site is currently known as Southall Railway Centre.

References 

Railway depots in London